Habermas is a surname. Notable people with the surname include:

Jürgen Habermas (born 1929), German sociologist and philosopher
Rebekka Habermas (born 1959), German historian
Gary Habermas (born 1950), American philosophical theologian